The Department of Health and Aged Care (DHAC), formerly the Department of Health, is a department of the Australian Government responsible for health research, funding, promotion and regulation in Australia. Primary health care and aged care services are overseen by DHAC, while tertiary health services are administered by state and territory governments. The department is responsible for programs such as Medicare, the Pharmaceutical Benefits Scheme, and agencies such as the Therapeutic Goods Administration and the National Health and Medical Research Council.

The department is responsible to parliament through the minister for health and aged care, and is supported by four assistant ministers. The department secretary, Brendan Murphy, is responsible for day-to-day accountability of the organisation. The chief medical officer is Paul Kelly, who oversees clinical operations.

History
The first Department of Health was established in 1921 and was the precursor to today's Department of Health. It was dissolved in 1987, when it was merged with the Department of Community Services to form the Department of Community Services and Health.

In June 1991, the Department of Health, Housing and Community Services was formed when housing industry programs were transferred from the Department of Industry, Technology and Commerce. In March 1993 the Department of Immigration, Local Government and Ethnic Affairs joined with the Department of Health, Housing and Community Services to form the Department of Health, Housing, Local Government and Community Services. Subsequently, in December 1993, the department was abolished and replaced with the Department of Human Services and Health. Also in 1994, the Office of Aboriginal and Torres Strait Islander Health was established.

After a new government was elected in March 1996, the Department of Health and Family Services was formed. The department also had responsibility for the Supported Accommodation Assistance Program from the former Department of Housing and Regional Development. Later, the department assumed responsibility for Aboriginal and Torres Strait Islander health matters from the Aboriginal and Torres Strait Islander Commission.

After the October 1998 election, the department was abolished and replaced by the Australian Federal Department of Health and Aged Care, named to reflect new responsibilities and functions. Responsibility for Family and Children's Services, Disability Programs and the Commonwealth Rehabilitation Service were transferred to the Department of Family and Community Services on 22 October 1998.

Following the November 2001 election, the Australian Federal Department of Health and Aged Care was abolished and replaced with the Australian Federal Department of Health and Ageing. The Australian Federal Department of Health and Ageing was abolished in 2013 and replaced by the current Australian Federal Department of Health on 18 September 2013 by way of an Administrative Arrangements Order issued by the Governor-General of Australia on the recommendation of the Abbott Government.

Role of Secretary

Chief Medical Officer Professor Brendan Murphy, was appointed Secretary of the department, commencing 13 July 2020 (was originally to commence 1 March 2020). He is the first medical doctor to serve as Secretary. He went on to become "the public face of Australia's fight against COVID-19" during the COVID-19 pandemic in Australia, giving several press conferences with the Prime Minister, Scott Morrison, and Health Minister Greg Hunt.

Scope

According to the Administrative Arrangements Order issued 18 September 2013, matters dealt with by the department are:
 Public health, including health protection, and medical research
 Health promotion and disease prevention
 Primary health care
 Hospitals funding and policy, including relationships and linkages within the continuum of health care
 Implementation of the National Health and Hospitals Network
 Health research
 Pharmaceutical benefits
 Health benefits schemes
 Hearing services policy and funding
 Specific health services, including human quarantine
 Sport and recreation
 National drug strategy
 Regulation of therapeutic goods
 Notification and assessment of industrial chemicals
 Gene technology regulation
 Medical indemnity insurance issues
 Private health insurance
 Blood, Organ and Dental policy and funding
 Health workforce capacity
 Mental health policy and primary mental health care

See also

 Minister for Health
 Minister for Ageing
 List of Australian Commonwealth Government entities

References 

Health
Australia, Health
Australia
Public policy in Australia
Medical and health organisations based in Australia
Health policy in Australia
2013 establishments in Australia